Le Grand Paysage d'Alexis Droeven is a 1981 Belgian drama film directed by Jean-Jacques Andrien. It was entered into the 31st Berlin International Film Festival where it won an Honourable Mention. It also received the André Cavens Award for Best Film by the Belgian Film Critics Association (UCC). The film was selected as the Belgian entry for the Best Foreign Language Film at the 54th Academy Awards, but was not accepted as a nominee.

Cast
 Jan Decleir as Jacob
 Nicole Garcia as Elizabeth
 Maurice Garrel as Alexis
 Jerzy Radziwilowicz as Jean-Pierre

See also
 List of submissions to the 54th Academy Awards for Best Foreign Language Film
 List of Belgian submissions for the Academy Award for Best Foreign Language Film

References

External links

1981 films
Belgian drama films
1980s French-language films
1981 drama films
Films directed by Jean-Jacques Andrien
French-language Belgian films